Ramsey railway station is a sign post station stop on Via Rail's Sudbury – White River train, located in Ramsey, Ontario, Canada.

References

Via Rail stations in Ontario
Railway stations in Sudbury District